Umarsara is a census town in Yavatmal district in the Indian state of Maharashtra.

Demographics
At the 2001 India census, Umarsara had a population of 19,064 (53% males, 47% females). The average literacy rate was 82%, higher than the national average of 59.5%: male literacy was 86% and female literacy was 78%. In Umarsara. 11% of the population were under 6 years of age.

References

Cities and towns in Yavatmal district